was a Japanese-born economist.

Biography
He was born in Tokyo, as a member of family running Ando Corporation, a major construction company. He didn't join the family business, and came to the United States after World War II. He received his B.S. in economics from the Seattle University in 1951, his M.A. in economics from St. Louis University in 1953, and an M.S. in economics in 1956 and a Ph.D. in mathematical economics in 1959 from Carnegie Institute of Technology (now Carnegie Mellon University). At Carnegie Mellon he collaborated, among others, with Herbert A. Simon on questions regarding aggregation and causation in economic systems and with Franco Modigliani on the life cycle analysis of saving, spending, and income.

Albert Ando was a tenured professor of economics and finance at the University of Pennsylvania from 1967 until his death from leukemia in 2002.

Awards and fellowships
 Ford Foundation Faculty Research Fellow, 1970
 Japan Foundation Fellow
 Alexander von Humboldt Award for Senior American Scientists
 Guggenheim Fellow, 1970.
 Fellow, Econometric Society, elected 1966.
 Alexander Henderson Award, 1955.

References

External links
 Obituary written by Lawrence Klein.
 Empirical Analysis of Economic Institutions Discussion Paper Series No.78 written by Charles Yuji Horioka, 15 October 2005.

1929 births
2002 deaths
People from Tokyo
Japanese economists
University of Pennsylvania faculty
Fellows of the Econometric Society
Carnegie Mellon University alumni
20th-century American economists
Seattle University alumni
Saint Louis University alumni
Japanese emigrants to the United States
American academics of Japanese descent